Buchanan may refer to:

People
 Buchanan (surname)

Places

Africa
 Buchanan, Liberia, a large coastal town

Antarctica
 Buchanan Point, Laurie Island

Australia
 Buchanan, New South Wales
 Buchanan, Northern Territory, a locality
 Buchanan, South Australia, a locality

Canada
 Buchanan, Saskatchewan
 Rural Municipality of Buchanan No. 304, Saskatchewan

Puerto Rico
 Fort Buchanan, Puerto Rico, a US Army installation

United Kingdom
 Buchanan, Stirling, Scotland

United States
Buchanan, Tuolumne County, California, unincorporated community
 Fort Buchanan, Kansas, a former town and pioneer fort
 Buchanan, Georgia, city 
 Buchanan, Indiana, unincorporated community
 Buchanan, Iowa, unincorporated community 
 Buchanan, Michigan, city
 Buchanan, New York, village
 Buchanan, North Dakota, city
 Buchanan, Oregon, unincorporated community
 Buchanan, Tennessee
 Buchanan, Texas, former community
 Buchanan, Virginia, town
 Buchanan, Wisconsin, town
 Buchanan Township, Michigan
 Fort Buchanan, Arizona, former US Army base

Music 

 Buchanan (band), an Australian alternative rock band

Other uses 

 Clan Buchanan
 Buchanan (car), an Australian carmaker
 Buchanan (horse), an American Thoroughbred racehorse, the winner of the 1884 Kentucky Derby
 Buchanan High School (Clovis, California), a high school in Clovis, California, USA
 Buchanan High School, North Lanarkshire, a high school in Coatbridge, North Lanarkshire, Scotland
 Buchanan's, a brand of Scotch whisky
 Buchanan v. Warley, a 1917 United States Supreme Court case.

See also 

 Buchanan County (disambiguation)
 Buchanan Valley (disambiguation)
 Buckhannon
 Justice Buchanan (disambiguation)